The Norfolk Southern James River Bridge is a bridge that carries Norfolk Southern Railway traffic over the James River in downtown Richmond, Virginia.  The bridge was built by the Southern Railway. The bridge is over 2,000 feet long, and also spans over the western edge of Mayo Island.

The bridge originally connected the Richmond and Danville Railroad to the Richmond and York River Railroad both of which became part of the Southern Railway System. The southern end of the bridge runs beneath what is today the Manchester Floodwall Walk Observation Area. On the north shore it leads to the lowest section of the Triple Crossing.

References

Norfolk Southern Railway bridges
Southern Railway (U.S.)
Bridges over the James River (Virginia)
Truss bridges in the United States
Bridges in Richmond, Virginia
Road bridges in Virginia
Plate girder bridges in the United States